Helicosporidium is a genus of colorless, pathogenic algae in the class Trebouxiophyceae of the green algae. It is a parasite found in the gut of insects, and a close relative of Prototheca.

References

External links
 AlgaeBase page for Helicosporidium

Trebouxiophyceae genera
Chlorellaceae